Niditinea is a genus of the fungus moth family, Tineidae. Therein, it belongs to the nominate subfamily, Tineinae.

Species
The 12 or 13 species currently placed in Niditinea are:
 Niditinea baryspilas (Meyrick, 1937) (= N. unipunctella)
 Niditinea contrariella Zeller, 1877
 Niditinea erschoffi Zagulayev, 1983
 Niditinea fuscella – brown-dotted clothes moth
 Niditinea nigrocapitella Zagulajev, 1960
 Niditinea orleansella (Chambers, 1873)
 Niditinea pallidorsella (Zeller, 1877)
 Niditinea piercella (Bentinck, 1935) (= N. ignotella (Zagulajev, 1956; non Walker, 1863: preoccupied), N. distinguenda. Sometimes in striolella)
 Niditinea praeumbrata (Meyrick, 1919) (= N. negreai, N. scotocleptes)
 Niditinea sinensis Petersen & Gaedike, 1993
 Niditinea striolella (Matsumura, 1931) (= N. pacifella, N. semidivisa)
 Niditinea truncicolella (Tengström, 1848) (= N. rosenbergerella)
 Niditinea tugurialis (Meyrick, 1932)

Footnotes

References

  (2009): Niditinea. Version 2.1, 2009-DEC-22. Retrieved 2010-MAY-05.
  (2004a): Butterflies and Moths of the World, Generic Names and their Type-species – Niditinea. Version of 2004-NOV-05. Retrieved 2010-MAY-05.
  (2004b): Butterflies and Moths of the World, Generic Names and their Type-species – "Tineidia". Version of 2004-NOV-05. Retrieved 2010-MAY-05.
  [2010]: Global Taxonomic Database of Tineidae (Lepidoptera). Retrieved 2010-MAY-05.

Tineinae